Takashi Nishizawa  is a Japanese mixed martial artist.

Mixed martial arts record

|-
| Win
| align=center| 1-2
| Seiichi Tsurusaki
| KO
| Shooto - Shooto
| 
| align=center| 1
| align=center| 0:53
| Tokyo, Japan
| 
|-
| Loss
| align=center| 0-2
| Mamoru Okochi
| Submission (triangle choke)
| Shooto - Shooto
| 
| align=center| 1
| align=center| 0:00
| Tokyo, Japan
| 
|-
| Loss
| align=center| 0-1
| Tadashi Murakami
| Submission (achilles lock)
| Shooto - Shooto
| 
| align=center| 1
| align=center| 1:12
| Tokyo, Japan
|

See also
List of male mixed martial artists

References

External links
 
 Takashi Nishizawa at mixedmartialarts.com

Japanese male mixed martial artists
Living people
Year of birth missing (living people)